Vladimir Ivanovich Voronin (October 17, 1890 – October 18, 1952) was a Soviet Navy captain, born in Sumsky Posad, in the present Republic of Karelia, Russia. In 1932 he commanded the expedition of the Soviet icebreaker A. Sibiryakov which made the first successful crossing of the Northern Sea Route in a single navigation without wintering. This voyage was organized by the All-Union Arctic Institute (presently known as the Arctic and Antarctic Research Institute).

The A. Sibiryakov expedition
The A. Sibiryakov sailed from Arkhangelsk, crossed the Kara Sea and chose a northern, unexplored way around Severnaya Zemlya to the Laptev Sea. In September the propeller shaft broke and the icebreaker drifted for 11 days. However, the A. Sibiryakov used its sails and arrived in the Bering Strait in October. The icebreaker reached the Japanese port of Yokohama after 65 days, having covered more than 2500 miles in the Arctic seas. This was regarded as a heroic feat of Soviet polar seamen and Chief of Expedition Otto Schmidt and Captain Vladimir Voronin were received with many honors on their return to Russia.

The icebreaker A. Sibiryakov continued in service until it was sunk in 1942 after an unequal fight with German heavy cruiser Admiral Scheer during Operation Wunderland in World War II.

The Chelyuskin expedition
In 1933-34 Voronin commanded another icebreaker on a dramatic, albeit not so fortunate, expedition. In July 1933 the Chelyuskin sailed from Leningrad before a large crowd. However, in September icebreaker Chelyuskin got stuck in pack ice in the Chukchi Sea near Kolyuchin Island. The crew worked hard to free the ship from the surrounding ice, succeeding after almost a week. But the ship became stuck again and drifted in the general direction of the pack ice toward the Bering Strait. By the end of November it became obvious that the Chelyuskin would not break free from the pack ice and would have to winter on the Chukchi Sea. Eventually the ship was squeezed by large ice floes and was in danger of sinking. Captain Voronin ordered the crew to unload equipment from the ship and set up a camp site astern of the ship. But cracks in the ice formed under the tents, forcing the crew to load their equipment back onto the ship. The Chelyuskin drifted for the next two months in the Chukchi Sea to the east of Wrangel Island.

Finally, increasing pressure resulted in the ship's creaking and eventual breach by ice. Voronin and Otto Schmidt managed to jump off just in time before the Chelyuskin sank close to Kolyuchin Island. Thus only one crew member went down with the ship. The crew then set up tents on a part of the ice surface that was named Camp Schmidt. The crew made radio contact with the village of Uelen on the Chukchi Peninsula and asked for help. During a dramatic rescue operation, pilot Anatoly Lyapidevsky sighted Camp Schmidt, landed his plane on the ice, and rescued the women and children before returning to Uelen. The remaining passengers and crew of the ill-fated icebreaker Chelyuskin were rescued later and flown to Cape Vankarem on the Chukotka Peninsula. Due to severe weather conditions, the rescue took one month with planes trying hard to carry out the rescue operation from Khabarovsk; Nome in Alaska; and Cape Olyutor until they were successful.

Memory
Some geographic locations in Russia have been named in honor of this Soviet captain and explorer of the Arctic waters
Voronina Island, a small island group in the Kara Sea. 
Banka Voronina, a shoal in the Gulf of Finland .
Bukhta Voronina, a bay in the NW shores of Novaya Zemlya .
 The Voronin Trough, a geological feature in the Arctic Ocean basin with a depth of 450m located 290 km east of Franz Josef Land.

Cape Voronin off Viachtu Bay in Sakhalin Island, however, is not named after Captain Vladimir Voronin, but after Second lieutenant Aleksey Ivanovich Voronin, a previous Russian explorer who took part in the 1849-1855 Amur Expedition.

ARC-7 class Ice breaking LNG carrier launched in 2019 named Vladimir Voronin in his honor. Vessel regularly makes unescorted passages of the Northern Sea Route carry LNG from LNG plant in Sabetta to Europe and Asia.

References

 Armstrong, T., The Russians in the Arctic, London, 1958.
 Early Soviet Exploration
 History of Russian Arctic Exploration
Voronin Trough

1890 births
1952 deaths
People from the Republic of Karelia
People from Kemsky Uyezd
Second convocation members of the Supreme Soviet of the Soviet Union
Recipients of the Order of Lenin
Recipients of the Order of Nakhimov, 2nd class
Recipients of the Order of the Red Banner of Labour
Recipients of the Order of the Red Star
Explorers of the Arctic
Russian and Soviet polar explorers
Russian explorers
Russian Navy personnel
Soviet explorers
Soviet Navy officers
Chukchi Sea
East Siberian Sea
Kara Sea
Laptev Sea